The 1986 Alabama gubernatorial election saw the election of Republican H. Guy Hunt over Democrat Bill Baxley.  In state politics, this election is largely seen as a realigning election since Hunt was the first Republican to be elected governor in 114 years – the last Republican to be elected was David P. Lewis in 1872 during the Reconstruction era. In March 1986, incumbent George Wallace announced that he would not seek a fifth term as governor, ending an era in Alabama politics.

Though Alabama had supported Republicans in national elections, state and local elections were dominated by Democrats. Therefore many people anticipated that the winner of the Democratic primary would win the election.

Democratic primary

Candidates
Bill Baxley, Lieutenant Governor
Charles Graddick, Attorney General of Alabama
Fob James, former Governor
George McMillan, former Lieutenant Governor and candidate for Governor in 1982
Barbara E. O'Neal

Results

Controversy
The Democratic primary brought out a number of candidates. It resulted in a runoff between Lieutenant Governor Bill Baxley and Attorney General Charles Graddick. Graddick, the more conservative  of the two Democrats, won the runoff election by a slim margin. Baxley challenged the results, and claimed that Graddick violated Democratic Party rules by encouraging people who voted in the Republican primary to cross over and vote in the Democratic runoff election. While Republicans in the state have held open primaries for years, the Democrats bar Republicans and Independents from voting in its primary election. This challenge went to the Alabama Supreme Court, which ruled that crossover voting had taken place in large numbers and that the Democratic Party either had to select Baxley as the nominee or hold another runoff election. The party opted to name Baxley as its nominee.

General election and aftermath

Results

The selection of Baxley spurned a negative reaction from Graddick's supporters.  As a result, they supported Guy Hunt in the general election, who won with 56 percent of the vote.

This election marked the transformation of politics in Alabama from a state dominated by many perspectives in one party to a two-party state.

References

Governor
1986
Alabama